Jason LaRay Keener (born May 12, 1985) is an American filmmaker from Alabama. He is best known for his stream-of-conscious, non-linear shorts. He is related to serial killer Nannie Doss. In 2006, he founded the Jacksonville State University Film Society. In 2012, he married frequent collaborator Diane Rose (Hallelujah! Gorilal Revival, The Unreinable Compulsion).

Reining Nails & Catfish with Falcon Wings
In 2006, Keener founded his production company, Reining Nails. From 2006 to 2009, he directed several Southern Gothic-inspired surrealistic short films. His film Hallelujah! Gorilla Revival featured guest voice-overs from filmmakers Cory McAbee, Damon Packard, Todd Rohal and Jamie Stewart of the bands Ten in the Swear Jar, Xiu Xiu and Former Ghosts. The film won Best Experimental Short at the 2009 Nashville Film Festival, as well as Best Alabama Short Film and the Kathryn Tucker Windham Storytelling Award at the 11th annual Sidewalk Moving Picture Festival.

In 2009, Keener released a DVD+R EP of his short films entitled Catfish with Falcon Wings. Catfish with Falcon Wings has been remixed by Brighter Death Now as projection for live shows.

In 2011, the short films of Catfish with Falcon Wings were curated alongside films by Woody Allen, Jean-Luc Godard, Harmony Korine, and David Lynch as part of a film series on problems in contemporary society. The series was programmed by the Pavilion Unicredit Art Gallery in Bucharest, Romania .

In 2010, Keener directed the music video for Xiu Xiu's song, "House Sparrow," from the album Dear God, I Hate Myself. The video stars Sandi Hanson (The Unreinable Compulsion) and Lane Hughes (V/H/S, You're Next).

The Unreinable Compulsion
The Unreinable Compulsion, described as a psychological drama about an irrational murder, is Keener's first feature-length film. The film stars Jarrod Cuthrell and features actor/dentist Dr. George Hardy (Troll 2, Best Worst Movie) as himself. Keener cites Robert Bresson, John Carpenter, Unsolved Mysteries, Flannery O'Connor, and Edward Hopper as the primary influences for the style and tone of the film, in which a young man in a small town gives in to his irrational desire to recreationally murder a stranger.

Synopsis
After loner Dewayne Sykes (Jarrod Cuthrell) decides to give in to his irrational desire to recreationally murder a stranger, he begins his search for a random victim and finds one in “Miss Fit” (Jen Stedham), a young jogger he spies at a park. After briefly familiarizing himself with her neighborhood and schedule, he puts his plan into action and commits a murder that will haunt him in ways he could not anticipate.

Collinsville Trade Day, 1988
Collinsville Trade Day, 1988 is an upcoming short documentary co-directed and edited by Jason LaRay Keener. It's a found-footage collaboration with his grandfather, Charles Keener, based on footage Charles shot in 1988 of a popular outdoor market in the Northeast Alabama town of Collinsville. The film will debut at the 2015 Nashville Film Festival in Nashville, Tennessee.

Synopsis
In 1988, Charles Keener took a video camera to Collinsville, AL to document the town's outdoor market for his young grandson. 26 years later, this newly discovered footage has been edited by the grandson into a short documentary.

Filmography

Feature films
 The Unreinable Compulsion (2013)

Short films
 Collinsville Trade Day, 1988 (2014)
 Hollow Porcelain Fish Chamber (2009)
 Hallelujah! Gorilla Revival (2008)
 Hail Cracking Cobra Eggs (2007)
 The Man with Apple-Shaped Boxing Gloves (2006)

Music videos
 "House Sparrow" Xiu Xiu -  (2010)

As actor
 Laura Panic (2007)
 The Man with Apple-Shaped Boxing Gloves (2006)

As score composer
 Hollow Porcelain Fish Chamber (2009)
 Hallelujah! Gorilla Revival (2008)
 1000 Year Sleep (2007)
 Hail Cracking Cobra Eggs (2007)
 The Man with Apple-Shaped Boxing Gloves'' (2006)

References

External links
Official site
The Unreinable Compulsion trailer
Collinsville Trade Day, 1988 Official page

AL.com review of Catfish with Falcon Wings
Anniston Star: Filmmaker Keener happy where he is
Anniston Star: Local filmmaker to premier DVD in Birmingham

1985 births
People from Cherokee County, Alabama
American experimental filmmakers
Living people